Siruiyeh or Siruyeh may refer to:
 Siruiyeh, Hormozgan
 Siruiyeh, Kerman